"This Old Man" is an English language children's song, counting exercise and nursery rhyme with a Roud Folk Song Index number of 3550.

Origins and history 

The origins of this song are obscure. There is a version noted in Anne Gilchrist's Journal of the English Folk Dance and Song Society (1937), learned from her Welsh nurse in the 1870s under the title "Jack Jintle".

Variations 
Nicholas Monsarrat (1910–1979), in his autobiography Life Is a Four Letter Word, refers to the song as being 'a Liverpool song' adding that it was 'local and original' during his childhood in Liverpool. A similar version was included in Cecil Sharp and Sabine Baring-Gould's English Folk-Songs for Schools, published in 1906. It was collected several times in England in the early 20th century with a variety of lyrics. In 1948 it was included by Pete Seeger and Ruth Crawford in their American Folk Songs for Children and recorded by Seeger in 1953. It received a boost in popularity when it was adapted for the film The Inn of the Sixth Happiness (1958) by composer Malcolm Arnold as "The Children's Marching Song", which led to hit singles for Cyril Stapleton and Mitch Miller, both versions making the Top 40. The song was used in the "Tamba's Abacus" game from Tikkabilla

References

English children's songs
English folk songs
Songs about old age
Traditional children's songs
Bob Dylan songs
Counting-out rhymes
English nursery rhymes
Year of song unknown
Songwriter unknown